Minger may refer to:

 Becky Minger (born 1987), Miss Ohio 2010 and competitor in the Miss America 2011 Pageant
 Pete Minger (1943–2000), American jazz musician
 Rudolf Minger (1881–1955), Swiss politician
 Minger Email Address Verification Protocol
 Piz Mingèr, mountain

See also
 Minge (disambiguation)